Zaira may refer to:

People
Zaira Bas (born 1994), Spanish beauty queen
Zaira Cosico, Filipino ballerina
Zaira Nara (born 1988), Argentine model
Zaira Ollano (1904–1997), Italian physicist
Zaira Wasim (born 2000), Indian Bollywood actress

Other uses
Zaira (fly), a parasitic fly
Zaira (opera), an Italian opera based on Voltaire's play Zaïre
 Zaira, a small town on Vangunu, Solomon Islands

See also
Zaire (disambiguation)
Zara (name)
Zaria, Kaduna State, Nigeria